Billy Matthew King (born January 23, 1966) is an American basketball executive. He is the former general manager of the Brooklyn Nets and Philadelphia 76ers NBA teams, as well as former team president of the 76ers.

Early life and education
King grew up in Sterling, Virginia where he played basketball at Park View High School.

He received a scholarship to play at Duke University and wore jersey number 55. He was known primarily for his tough defense. In his senior season, he served as a captain of Duke's 1988 Final Four team and was named NABC National Defensive Player of The Year.

Post-playing career
King served as an assistant coach for the Indiana Pacers for four seasons under Larry Brown. He joined the professional ranks after spending four seasons as an assistant at Illinois State University under head coach Bob Bender. King also spent one year as a color analyst for ESPN's men's basketball coverage of the Ohio Valley Conference.

King then joined the Philadelphia 76ers on June 2, 1997, as vice president of basketball administration. On May 19, 1998, he was promoted to general manager, and on April 5, 2000, he signed a new contract to stay with the team for an extended term. On May 26, 2003, he was named president along with general manager.

In 2005, King and other individuals became prominent investors in a Foxwoods Resort Casino proposed for Philadelphia, Pennsylvania. In September 2008, facing massive opposition at the originally proposed waterfront location, backers for the slots casino decided to seek a new location in the Center City area, next to Philadelphia's Chinatown community. As of January 2009, the casino did not have a building permit.

On December 4, 2007, the 76ers replaced King with former New Jersey Nets general manager Ed Stefanski.

On July 14, 2010, King was hired as a general manager for the New Jersey Nets, replacing former Nets president and general manager Rod Thorn. As general manager of the Nets, King's legacy in the NBA was hurt by a series of oft-criticized trades that were deemed among the "worst in league history". On January 10, 2016, it was announced that the Nets had reassigned King. His position would be replaced by former NBA player and San Antonio Spurs assistant general manager Sean Marks.

On October 2, 2019, it was announced that King was joining the morning sport talk radio show on 94 WIP in Philadelphia.
On March 28, 2022, Billy King was hired by Modern Executive Solutions as a Senior Partner Head of Sports and Entertainment.

Personal life
King married the former Melanie Lynn Frantz on August 27, 2005. They have three children.

References

1966 births
Living people
African-American basketball players
African-American sports executives and administrators
American men's basketball players
American sports executives and administrators
Basketball players from Virginia
Brooklyn Nets executives
College basketball announcers in the United States
Duke Blue Devils men's basketball players
Illinois State Redbirds men's basketball coaches
Indiana Pacers assistant coaches
Medalists at the 1987 Summer Universiade
National Basketball Association general managers
Philadelphia 76ers executives
People from Sterling, Virginia
Universiade medalists in basketball
Universiade silver medalists for the United States
21st-century African-American people
20th-century African-American sportspeople